Millicent (Milly) Tanner (born 10 January 1999) is an English international track cyclist.

Personal
Tanner attended Millfield School.

Cycling career
Tanner became a British team champion after winning the team sprint Championship at the 2020 British National Track Championships with Blaine Ridge-Davis. She had previously finished second in 2019.

In 2021, Tanner won team sprint bronze at the UCI Track World Championships in Roubaix, France.

At the 2023 British Cycling National Track Championships she won her second national title, after winning the team sprint again.

References

External links

1999 births
Living people
English female cyclists
English track cyclists
Sportspeople from Exeter
Cyclists at the 2022 Commonwealth Games
Commonwealth Games competitors for England
People educated at Millfield